Penthouse Party is a TV variety series which aired on American Broadcasting Company in 1950 and 1951.

Broadcast history
The 30-minute show was produced by Lester Lewis (1912-1988), was hosted by Betty Furness, and ran for 39 episodes from September 15, 1950 to June 8, 1951.

From September to December 1950, the show aired Fridays from 10 to 10:30pm ET. From January to June 1951, the show aired Fridays 8:30 to 9pm ET. The show was replaced by The Jerry Colonna Show.

See also
1950-51 United States network television schedule

References

External links

Penthouse Party at CTVA
Penthouse Party theme song at ClassicThemes

American Broadcasting Company original programming
Black-and-white American television shows
1950 American television series debuts
1951 American television series endings